Tetrarhanis laminifer is a butterfly in the family Lycaenidae. It is found in Cameroon, Equatorial Guinea (Mbini) and Gabon. The habitat consists of primary forests.

References

Butterflies described in 1965
Poritiinae